Purple monkeyflower is a common name for several plants and may refer to:

Mimulus lewisii, great purple monkeyflower 
Mimulus nanus, dwarf purple monkeyflower
Mimulus purpureus, little purple monkeyflower